Kenneth Sharples (1924–1967) was an international speedway rider from England.

Speedway career 
Sharples won eight England caps and rode in the top tier of British Speedway from 1948 to 1965, riding primarily for Belle Vue Aces. He was a product of the Hyde Road Training School and finished in the top ten UK averages during the 1955 Speedway National League riding for Belle Vue.

He went on to be team manager at Belle Vue Aces.

References 

1924 births
1967 deaths
British speedway riders
Belle Vue Aces riders
Newcastle Diamonds riders
Sheffield Tigers riders
Edinburgh Monarchs riders
Sunderland Stars riders
People from Clayton-le-Moors